Cyril Salim Bustros (born January 26, 1939) is the archbishop of the Melkite Greek Catholic Archeparchy of Beirut and Byblos and a former Professor at Saint Joseph University in Beirut. A native of Lebanon, he formerly served as archbishop of Baalbeck and later as eparch for the Melkite Church in the United States.

Life
Archbishop Cyril was born at Ain-Borday, near Baalbek, Lebanon on January 26, 1939. He is a member of the Bustros family, a prominent clan in Lebanese society.

Education
After his primary and secondary studies at the Minor Seminary of St. Paul at Harissa, he pursued his philosophical studies at St. Paul Institute in 1956 and 1957, and made his novitiate at the White Fathers in Gap, France.  He then studied theology for four years (1958–1962) at the Major Seminary at St. Anne of  Jerusalem.

Priesthood
He was ordained to the priesthood in the Society of the Missionaries of Saint Paul on June 29, 1962.

From 1962 to 1970, he was Professor of Classical Greek and of French Literature at the Minor Seminary.  Then from 1972-1974 Professor of Philosophy and Theology at St. Paul Institute in Harissa.

Interrupting his teaching, he pursued a Doctorate of Theology at the Catholic University of Louvain in Belgium, and received his degree in 1976.  Bustros then served for eleven years as director of the St. Paul Institute of Philosophy and Theology at the Paulist Missionaries at Harissa. During this period he also held an appointment as Professor at Saint Joseph University in Beirut.

Episcopate

In 1988 the Holy Synod of the Melkite Catholic Church elected him archbishop of Baalbeck, succeeding Elias Zoghby.  He was ordained to the episcopate on November 27, 1988, in the Basilica of St. Paul in Harissa, by Maximos V Hakim, assisted by Archbishops Zoghby and Joseph Raya.

Bustros was appointed to lead the Melkite Catholic Church in the United States on June 22, 2004, replacing the retiring bishop John Elya.  He was enthroned as Eparch of Newton, Massachusetts at Annunciation Cathedral on August 18, 2004.

The archbishop is a member of the International Commission for Dialogue between the Catholic Church and the Assyrian Church of the East, and of the Standing Conference of American-Middle Eastern Christian and Muslim Religious Leaders.

In June 2011 the Holy Synod of the Melkite Church elected Archbishop Cyril Bustros to the Metropolitan See of Beirut. Taking his place as eparch of the United States is Bishop Nicholas Samra.

Distinctions 
 Grand Prior of the Province of the United States of the Patriarchal Order of the Holy Cross of Jerusalem

Notes

References

 The Melkite Handbook: Introducing the Melkite Greek Catholic Church. Published by the Office of Educational Services, Melkite Greek Catholic Eparchy of Newton (2008)

External links
Archbishop Cyril discusses the culture clash between Islam and the West

20th-century Eastern Catholic bishops
21st-century Eastern Catholic bishops
1939 births
Living people
People from Baalbek District
Melkite Greek Catholic bishops
Université catholique de Louvain alumni
Lebanese clergy
Lebanese Melkite Greek Catholics
Members of the Patriarchal Order of the Holy Cross of Jerusalem